Dorn is a surname.

Dorn may also refer to

Dorn, Gloucestershire, a hamlet in England
 River Dorn, in Oxfordshire, England
 Dorn, an alternative name for the Thornback ray
 Dorn (band), a German metal band
 Dorn (board game), a Czech board game

See also 
 Doorn, a town in the Netherlands
 Dohrn (disambiguation)
 Van Dorn Street (Washington Metro)